Gumaca is a railway station located on the South Main Line in Quezon, Philippines. It is still used for the Bicol Express and Isarog Limited.

History
Gumaca was opened on May 10, 1916, as part of the extension of the Main Line South from Padre Burgos to Calauag, Quezon. The western side of the station building was demolished to give way for a new one.

Philippine National Railways stations
Railway stations in Quezon